Jesús Noel Valenzuela Sáez (born 24 November 1983) is a Venezuelan football referee who is a listed as an international referee for FIFA since 2013.

He made his officiating debut in the 2011–12 Venezuelan Primera División season.

On 14 December 2021, Valenzuela was named CONMEBOL's best referee for 2021 by the IFFHS.

References

External links 
 

1983 births
Living people
Venezuelan football referees
People from Portuguesa (state)
Copa América referees
2022 FIFA World Cup referees
FIFA World Cup referees